The African Handball Nations Championship is the official competition for senior national handball teams of Africa, and takes place every two years. In addition to crowning the African champions, the tournament also serves as a qualifying tournament for the Summer Olympics and For World Handball Championship.

Summary

 A round-robin tournament determined the final standings.

Medal table

Participating nations
Legend

 – Champions
 – Runners-up
 – Third place
 – Fourth place

Q — Qualified for upcoming tournament
 — Qualified but withdrew
 — Did not qualify
 — Did not enter / Withdrew from the Championship
 — Disqualified / Banned
 — Hosts

Best player award

See also
 African Women's Junior Handball Championship
 African Women's Youth Handball Championship
 African Women's Handball Champions League

External links
Official website
Handball Africa Archive (todor66.com)

 
Women's sports competitions in Africa
Recurring sporting events established in 1974